Victor Boştinaru (born 17 May 1952) is a Romanian member of the European Parliament and sits on the Committee for Regional Development (REGI) and Committee on Petitions (PETI). He is a member of the Social Democratic Party of Romania and in the European Union he is part of the Progressive Alliance of Socialists and Democrats.

Education

Boştinaru was educated at the University of Bucharest and holds two degrees from the university (achieved in 1974 and 1981). His degrees are in the areas of History, Geography and Philosophy. Boştinaru worked as Professor of History and Geography at multiple establishments.

Political life

Positions within Romania
In 1991, Boştinaru became Vice President of the National Salvation Front and Vice President of the Democratic Party. Boştinaru later went on to become chairman of the National Salvation Front.

In 1990, he was elected as the MP for Dâmboviţa, and served in this position until 2000. During his time as an MP he sat on committees of foreign affairs and the Committee of the Chamber of Deputies.

In April, Boştinaru became the leader of the Democratic Party Parliamentary Group and served as a member of the Romanian delegation to the OSCE Parliamentary Assembly (19 of 92–1996).

Other positions
Other posts Boştinaru subsequently held include:
Deputy Leader of the Democratic Party Parliamentary Group (April 1994).
Secretary of Foreign Policy of the Chamber of Deputies, Romanian Parliament (March–November 1996).
Chairman of Foreign Policy of the Chamber of Deputies, Parliament of Romania (1996–2000).
Member of the European Integration Committee of the Chamber of Deputies, Parliament of Romania (1996–2000).
President of the European Integration Committee of the Chamber of Deputies, Romanian Parliament (July - December. 2000).
Secretary of State, Ministry of Foreign Affairs (November 2004-Dec. 2004).
Adviser for Foreign Policy and International Relations of the President of the Chamber of Deputies (March 2001 - October. 2004).
Adviser for Foreign Policy and International Relations of the President of the Chamber of Deputies (January 2005 - April 2006).
USIA Program Participant (March 2003).
Founder and Vice President of National Advisory Council for Euro-Atlantic Integration (1993–1996).
Founder and Secretary General of the Atlantic Council of Romania (1993–1996).
Member of the Manfred Worner Foundation.

References

Living people
1952 births
Members of the Chamber of Deputies (Romania)
Social Democratic Party (Romania) MEPs
MEPs for Romania 2007–2009
MEPs for Romania 2009–2014
MEPs for Romania 2014–2019